National Tertiary Route 330, or just Route 330 (or ) is a National Road Route of Costa Rica, located in the San José province.

Description
In San José province the route covers Pérez Zeledón canton (Pejibaye district).

References

Highways in Costa Rica